Doumbé F.C. is a Togolese football club based in Sansanne Mango. They play in the top division in Togolese football. Their home stadium is Stade Municipal.

Achievements
Togolese Championnat National: 1
 1987
Coupe du Togo: 1
 1996

Performance in CAF competitions
 African Cup of Champions Clubs: 1 appearance
1988: First Round

Football clubs in Togo